Jeremy Mpobi Ngakia (born 7 September 2000) is an English professional footballer who plays as a right-back for  club Watford.

Career

Youth career
Born in Deptford, south London, Ngakia had a trial with Chelsea's academy before joining West Ham United at the age of 14 after being scouted by West Ham academy goalkeeping coach Jerome John whilst playing for Surrey Quays-based youth club Ballers Football Academy. Ngakia made his under-18 debut for West Ham during the 2016–17 season and later made his under-23 debut in February 2018.

West Ham United
On 29 January 2020, Ngakia made his debut for West Ham in a 2–0 Premier League loss against Liverpool.

In June 2020, with his contract due to finish at the end of the month, Ngakia turned down the offer of an extension leaving him available on a free transfer when his current contract ends. West Ham later confirmed his departure at the end of June 2020. Ngakia's last appearance for West Ham was the 2–0 Premier League defeat against Wolverhampton Wanderers on 20 June 2020 with West Ham still having seven games remaining in their 2019–20 campaign.

Watford
Ngakia signed for Championship side Watford on 14 August 2020 on a four-year contract. He made his debut on the opening day of the 2020–21 season, 11 September 2020, in a 1–0 home win against Middlesbrough.

Personal life
Born in England, Ngakia is of Congolese descent.

Career statistics

References

2000 births
Living people
Footballers from Brockley
Association football defenders
English footballers
English sportspeople of Democratic Republic of the Congo descent
Black British sportsmen
West Ham United F.C. players
Premier League players
Watford F.C. players
English Football League players